The Orlando Guardians are a professional American football team based in Orlando, Florida. The team was founded by Vince McMahon's Alpha Entertainment as the New York Guardians and is an owned-and-operated member of the XFL, owned by RedBird Capital Partners, Dwayne Johnson and Dany Garcia's Alpha Acquico, LLC. The Guardians played their home games at MetLife Stadium in 2020 and currently play at Camping World Stadium.

History

McMahon era (2020)

New York (2020) 

New York, joined Seattle, Houston, Los Angeles, St. Louis, D.C., Tampa Bay, and Dallas as the XFL's inaugural cities. On April 15, 2019, the team hired Kevin Gilbride, who most recently was the Offensive Coordinator for the New York Giants as their first head coach. The team name and logo were revealed on August 21, 2019, as well as the teams uniforms on December 3, 2019.

On October 15, 2019, The Guardians announced their first player in team history, being assigned former Oakland Raiders Quarterback Matt McGloin.

The Guardians won the first game in franchise history, topping the Tampa Bay Vipers 23–3 at MetLife Stadium. Quarterback Matt McGloin scored the first touchdown in team history on their first possession, a one-yard score that put them up 6–0. McGloin would later find Colby Pearson for a passing touchdown. Defensively, the Guardians forced three turnovers, including a fumble return for a touchdown by Jamar Summers. Tampa Bay reached the red zone five times, but emerged only with a field goal thanks to a standout defensive effort. The Guardians' first road game saw them become the victims of the first shutout in the new XFL's history, as they fell to the DC Defenders by a 27–0 final at Audi Field. The game became notable for a McGloin sideline interview with ABC/ESPN's Dianna Russini, in which he was very critical of the team's offensive gameplan. McGloin was eventually pulled from the game for backup Marquise Williams in the second half. On March 12, 2020, The XFL announced that the remainder of the 2020 XFL season had been cancelled due to the COVID-19 pandemic. The team finished with a 3-2 record. On April 10, 2020, The XFL Suspended operations, with all employees, players and staff would be terminated.

Dwayne Johnson and Dany Garcia era (2023-present)

Orlando (2023–present) 
As early as April 2020, the XFL was reported to have been relocating a team to Orlando. Orlando had not yet been available at the time the league chose its inaugural eight teams because of the Alliance of American Football placing the Orlando Apollos there, but it was one of the largest markets without an NFL team and had hosted the Orlando Rage, one of the most successful teams in the original XFL of 2001. The same reports had indicated that the league had hoped to stay in the New York metropolitan area, with the main obstacle being a stadium (MetLife Stadium was one of the largest stadiums in the XFL with one of the league's poorest average attendances); discussions had begun about potentially moving to the more appropriately sized Red Bull Arena. When team locations were revealed on July 25, 2022, the league (now under ownership of the Dany Garcia-Dwayne Johnson consortium) confirmed that Orlando would receive a team in 2023 and Tampa Bay would no longer have one. In the same announcement, the league also confirmed that there would also be no team in the New York area. However, when team brands were leaked in September and confirmed a month later, it was instead revealed that the Vipers brand would be relocated to Las Vegas, Nevada and that Orlando would receive the branding of the former New York Guardians.

Terrell Buckley was reported as the Orlando team's head coach on April 6, 2022; the league confirmed this on July 25.

Market overview 
The Guardians are the first professional outdoor football team in Orlando since the Orlando Apollos of the Alliance of American Football in 2019, where they averaged over 19,000 fans per game. The Guardians join the Orlando Magic, Orlando Solar Bears ,Orlando City SC, and the Orlando Pride as professional sports teams based in Orlando. The Guardians also join the Orlando Predators (NAL) as professional football teams located in Orlando.

Staff

Players

Current roster

Player and staff history

Head coach history

Offensive coordinator history

Defensive coordinator history

Former notable players 

 Scott Daly – Current Detroit Lions Long Snapper
 Matt McGloin – Former Oakland Raiders Quarterback

Current notable players 

 Matt Elam – Former Baltimore Ravens Defensive Back, 2013 1st Round Pick
 Cody Latimer – Former Denver Broncos Wide Receiver, 2014 2nd Round Pick
 Paxton Lynch – Former Denver Broncos Quarterback, 2016 1st Round Pick
 Eli Rogers – Former Pittsburgh Steelers Wide Receiver

References

External links